Noh Poetry Records is a San Francisco, California-based independent record label founded by musician Don Falcone and graphic artist Karen Anderson in May 1987. The label is dedicated to electronic, experimental, space rock and psychedelic music.

Their first release was "Kamarupa," by Spaceship Eyes (Falcone's electronic solo project). Other Falcone bands and projects released on Noh Poetry have included Astralfish (an instrumental project with Bridget Wishart, formerly of Hawkwind), Falcone & Palmer, Fireclan (with former members of Melting Euphoria), Grindlestone, Quiet Celebration, and Thessalonians (which included Kim Cascone, Falcone, Paul Neyrinck, and Larry Thrasher).

The label's first and only compilation to date featured various artists. Titled "Where Stalks the Sandman," it included tracks by Porcupine Tree's Steven Wilson, Praxis (a Bill Laswell musical project), and electronic music composer Kim Cascone (formerly of Thessalonians). The CD also featured "An Isolated Craft," the only track that Falcone ever released by Don Falcone (as opposed to being by a band or project).

In 2008, Noh Poetry released The Entropy Tango & Gloriana Demo Sessions, by Michael Moorcock & The Deep Fix. These were sessions for planned albums based on two of Moorcock's novels: "Gloriana, or The Unfulfill'd Queen" and The Entropy Tango.

In 2019, the label started re-releasing digital album versions of Falcone bands and projects that were originally released on European labels. These include various Spirits Burning albums and the second Quiet Celebration album.

In 2021, the label released the Spirits Burning album "Evolution Ritual," which included performances by musicians associated with King Crimson, Steeleye Span, Tangerine Dream, and Van Der Graaf Generator as a CD and digital album.

Discography

CD & Digital Albums

 Spaceship Eyes: Kamarupa (1997)
 Quiet Celebration: Quiet Celebration (2000)
 Where Stalks the Sandman: V/A (2001)
 Fireclan: Sunrise to Sunset (2004)
 Thessalonians: Solaristics (2005)
 Falcone & Palmer: Gothic Ships (2007)
 Grindlestone: one (2008)
 Michael Moorcock & The Deep Fix: "The Entropy Tango & Gloriana Demo Sessions" (2008)
 Grindlestone: tone (2011)
 Astralfish: Far Corners (2012)
 Spirits Burning: Evolution Ritual (2021)

Digital Album Re-Releases

 Spirits Burning & Daevid Allen "The Roadmap In Your Heart' EP (2022)
 Spirits Burning & Clearlight "The Roadmap In Your Head" (2022)
 Spirits Burning "Reflections In A Radio Shower (20220
 Spirits Burning "New Worlds By Design" (2022)
 Spirits Burning & Thom The World Poet “Golden Age Orchestra” (2021)
 Spirits Burning “Crazy Fluid” (2021)
 Spirits Burning & Bridget Wishart “Bloodlines” (2021)
 Spirits Burning “Found In Nature” (2021)
 Spirits Burning & Clearlight “Healthy Music In Large Doses” (2020)
 Spirits Burning “Starhawk” (2020)
 Spirits Burning & Bridget Wishart “Earth Born” (2020)
 Spirits Burning & Michael Moorcock “An Alien Heat” (2020)
 Spirits Burning “Alien Injection” (2020)
 Quiet Celebration “Sequel” (2020)

See also 
 List of record labels

References

External links
 Official website
 Facebook
 Don Falcone website
 Karen Anderson web gallery

American independent record labels
Record labels established in 1987
Electronic music record labels
Experimental music record labels